Denislavye is a rural locality (a selo) in Oksovskoye Rural Settlement of Plesetsky District, Arkhangelsk Oblast, Russia. The population was 38 as of 2010.

Geography 
Denislavye is located 21 km southwest of Plesetsk (the district's administrative centre) by road. Novostroyka is the nearest rural locality.

References 

Rural localities in Plesetsky District